Krš is a village in Perušić, Croatia. It had a population of 32 in 2011.

References

 

Populated places in Lika-Senj County